Dr. Teya Edvinova Sugareva (born December 5, 1989, Sofia, Bulgaria) is a Bulgarian theatre director, drama teacher, and poet.

Education 
 2003 - 2008 studied at the National School for Ancient Languages and Cultures "St Cyril", profiled in Humanities. Graduated with a thesis on "Poetics of Fabulous in the Prose of Alexander Vutimski"
 2008 - 2012 – studied in the Bachelor program Directing for Drama Theatre at the National Academy for Theatre and Film Arts. During her education there, she implemented the following projects:

As a director 
 2008 Lame Girl by Alexander Vutimski
 2008 Impulse after “January” by Yordan Radichkov
 2009 Twelfth Night by Shakespeare - composition
 2010 Hippolytus by Euripides
 2011 Endgame by Samuel Beckett
 2011 Fire Dragon after Geo Milev, Ivan Radoev, and Alexander Vutimski 
 2012 Dead Souls by Mikhail Bulgakov after N. V. Gogol

As an assistant director 
 2010 Liars Club by Neil LaBute, director Prof. Snejina Tankovska
 2011 Journey to the West by Mary Zimmerman, director Prof. Snejina Tankovska
 2011 Richard III by Shakespeare, directed by Prof. Snejina Tankovska
 2011 The Followers of Confucius by Khan Dinin, director Prof. Snejina Tankovska
 2012 - 2013 studied in Master program Theater Arts at the National Academy for Theatre and Film Arts. Graduated with a thesis on "Aspects of the Collaboration between Director and Playwright in Modern Bulgarian Theater", with supervisor Prof. Snejina Tankovska

Participation in international projects 
 2009 "Teacher's Academy", organized by the European League of Institutes of the Arts (ELIA) - coordinator of student groups 
 2010 The first meeting of GATS (Global Alliance of the Theatre Schools) - coordinator of student groups
 2014 Drama League Directors Project - Drama League Fellow

Participation in workshops 
 2009 The Body Tells the Story - Amanda Brennan
 2009 Like a Puppet on a String - Francesca Trevzer and May Fryuh
 2009 Street Theatre - a Case Study - Ger Clancy and Monica Binek
 2010 Dialogues with Your Voice - Kristin Linklater 
 2011 Movement Elements of Classical Chinese Beijing Opera - Jian Xu
 2012 From Page to Stage – Roger Danforth and Lydia Starck
 2013 Viewpoints – Barbara Lanciers, Juanita Rockwell, Gabriel Shanks
 2014 Physical Theatre and Clown Acting – Steve Pacek
 2014 Acting the Song – Zi Alikhan
 2014 Vocal Viewpoints - Jen Waldman

Professional performances 
 September 2012 The Miser by Molière, implemented under the project "Bridge Between Generations" of Montfiz, co-production with Drama Theatre "Nevena Kokanova" in Yambol, Bulgaria
 October 2012 Walled in Ones by Yassen Vassilev, production of the Youth Theatre "Nikolay Binev", Sofia, Bulgaria
 June 2013 Welcome, America! by Matthew Vishniek, production of Theatre "Sofia", Sofia, Bulgaria
 September 2013 Robin by Anna Topaldjikova, independent production of "Antract" and theater “Vuzrajdane”, Sofia, Bulgaria
 March 2014 Invitation to Dinner by Olya Stoyanova, production of Theatre "Sofia", Sofia, Bulgaria
 June 2014 This Property is Condemned by Tennessee Williams, production of The Hangar Theatre, Ithaca, NY, United States
 July 2014 The Little Prince, after the book by Antoine de Saint-Exupéry, production of The Hangar Theatre, Ithaca, NY, USA
 July 2014 Oedipus after Sophocles, production of The Hangar Theatre, Ithaca, NY, USA – participated as producer and fight choreographer

Teaching experience 
 September 2012 – until now, assistant of Prof. Tankovska; leads classes in "Directing for Drama Theatre" and "Acting for Drama Theatre" at The National Academy for Theatre and Film Arts
 March 2014 – co-leader of Stanislavski's System - Actors Training workshop at The National Academy for students from Toho, Japan
 July 2014 – leader of Actors Training in European Theatre workshop at The Hangar Theatre in Ithaca, NY, USA

Research activity 
 January 2014 is a PhD candidate in the Department "Acting and Directing for Drama Theatre" at the National Academy for Theatre and Film Arts

Participated in the following festivals 
 July 2011 GATS Theatre Festival in Beijing, China as director of "Fire Dragon" after Geo Milev, Ivan Radoev, Alexander Vutimski 
 June 2012 International Theatre Festival "Varna Summer" in Varna, Bulgaria as a director of "Dead Souls" by Bulgakov after Gogol 
 June 2013 International Theatre Festival "Varna Summer" in Varna, Bulgaria as a director of "Welkome America" by Matthew Vishniek 
 June 2013 Theatrical Holidays "Nevena Kokanova" in Yambol, Bulgaria as a director of "The Miser" by Molière
 October 2013 Days of Young Theater in Lovech, Bulgaria as a director of “Walled in Ones" by Yassen Vassilev

Awards and honors 
 2012 National Academy award “Most Most Most” in the category “Best Director for Drama Theatre" in the class of 2012
 2013 "Golden Kukerikon" - Award in the category "Young Force" for the direction of "Dead Souls" by M. Bulgakov after Gogol
 2014 “Icarus” – award in the category “Debut” for the direction of "Robin" by Anna Topaldjikova
 2014 “Ascer” nomination in the category “Directing” for the direction of “Invitation for Dinner” by Olya Stoyanova

Poetry awards 
 2005 to present - author of poetry, published in specialized magazines for poetry, award winner of national literary competitions:
 2007, 2008 "Petya Dubarova" in Burgas, Bulgaria
 2007 “Vazkresenie" (Resurrection) in Dobrich, Bulgaria
 2007 "Dushata na edin izvor" (The Soul of a Source) in Yambol, Bulgaria

21st-century Bulgarian actresses
Writers from Sofia
Living people
1989 births
Bulgarian stage actresses
Actresses from Sofia
Bulgarian poets
Bulgarian women writers
Entertainers from Sofia